Lin Chaopan (born 27 August 1995) is a Chinese artistic gymnast. He competed in the 2016 Summer Olympics in Rio de Janeiro, as well as the 2020 Summer Olympics in Tokyo, Japan.

Personal life 
Lin was born 27 August 1995 in Jinjiang, China. He started gymnastics at age five in Quanzhou, China after being scouting by coach Shi Boping.

Lin has received two awards. The General Administration of Sport of China named him an Elite Athlete of International Class in 2014 and presented him the Sports Medal of Honour in 2016.

Lin studied coaching at Beijing Sport University.

Career

2013 
Lin made his World Championships debut at the 2013 World Artistic Gymnastics Championships in Antwerp, Belgium. In the parallel bars final, he won the gold with a score of 15.666. He also placed eighth at the horizontal bar final and ninth in the Individual All-Around.

2014 
Lin was selected to compete at the 2014 World Artistic Gymnastics Championships in Nanning, China where he helped China win team gold. Lin failed to qualify for any individual finals.

2015 
Lin competed at World Championships in Glasgow, Great Britain, where his team placed third. He failed to qualify for any individual finals.

2016 
At the 2016 Chinese Gymnastics Championships he won all-around, parallel bars and floor gold.

Lin competed at the 2016 Olympic Games in Rio de Janeiro, Brazil, where his team placed third.

2017 
In August, Lin competed at the Asian Championships in Bangkok, Thailand, where his team placed first. He won second all around, as well as first on floor exercise and high bar.

In October, Lin competed at the World Championships in Montreal, Canada, where he placed second all around.

2018 
In August, Lin competed at the Asian Games in Indonesia, where his team placed first. He placed first all around, as well as third on floor exercise.

In October, Lin competed at the World Championships in Doha, Qatar, where his team placed first.

2019 
Lin competed at the World Championships in Stuttgart, Germany, where his team placed second.

2021 
At the 2020 Summer Olympics in Tokyo, Japan, Lin competed for the People's Republic of China, a team including Sun Wei, Zou Jingyuan, Xiao Ruoteng, and Lin Chaopan. The team won Olympic bronze with a combined score of 262.397, 0.606 points beneath the winning team.

References

External links 
  (archive1, archive2)

1995 births
Living people
2016 Olympic bronze medalists for China
Asian Games gold medalists for China
Asian Games bronze medalists for China
Asian Games medalists in gymnastics
Chinese male artistic gymnasts
Gymnasts at the 2018 Asian Games
Gymnasts at the 2016 Summer Olympics
Gymnasts at the 2020 Summer Olympics
Gymnasts from Fujian
Medalists at the World Artistic Gymnastics Championships
Medalists at the 2018 Asian Games
Medalists at the 2016 Summer Olympics
Medalists at the 2020 Summer Olympics
Olympic gymnasts of China
Olympic medalists in gymnastics
Olympic bronze medalists for China
Sportspeople from Quanzhou